Sherbrooke station is a Montreal Metro station in the borough of Le Plateau-Mont-Royal in Montreal, Quebec, Canada. It is operated by the Société de transport de Montréal (STM) and serves the Orange Line. This station, near downtown, opened on October 14, 1966, as part of the original network of the Metro.

Overview 

The station, designed by Jean Dumontier and Crevier, Lemieux, Mercier et Caron, is a normal side-platform station, built in open cut due to the difficulty of construction under Berri Street near the Sherbrooke Street overpass. It has a single mezzanine giving access to two entrances, one on either side of Berri Street, both integrated into buildings. There is an access tunnel that connects the integrated exit to the metro station as well as an exit to Sherbrooke street, the only one in the station. The walls are decorated in straw-yellow brick, purple ceiling louvres and bulkhead walls, and orange highlights.

Architecture and art 

The station's main artwork is a mosaic, the only one in the Metro, on the Côte-Vertu platform. Designed by Gabriel Bastien and Andrea Vau, it depicts the achievements of the Saint-Jean-Baptiste Society, whose headquarters are nearby. There are also two mural works by Mario Merola in the accesses.

Origin of the name
This station is named for Sherbrooke Street. Sir John Coape Sherbrooke (1764–1830) served as governor general of British North America 1816–1818. The street was named for him in 1817.

Connecting bus routes

Nearby points of interest

Institut de tourisme et d'hôtellerie du Québec
Parc Lafontaine
Saint-Louis Square
Théâtre d'Aujourd'hui
Théâtre de Quat'Sous
Hôpital Notre-Dame
Théâtre La Chapelle
Prince-Arthur Street

References

External links

Sherbrooke Station - official site
Montreal by Metro, metrodemontreal.com - photos, information, and trivia
 2011 STM System Map
 2011 Downtown System Map
 Metro Map

Orange Line (Montreal Metro)
Railway stations in Canada opened in 1966
Le Plateau-Mont-Royal